José Ortiz Bernal (born 4 August 1977) is a Spanish retired footballer who played usually as an attacking midfielder.

Most of his 15-year professional career was spent at Almería, where amassed La Liga totals of 82 games and one goal (adding 168 matches and 30 goals in Segunda División).

Club career
Ortíz was born in Almería, Andalusia. After beginning playing with hometown club UD Almería (then in the third division), he served an uneventful stint abroad with Italy's Ravenna Calcio.

Upon his return to Almería, Ortiz helped the side achieve promotion to the second level in 2002, scoring five goals in the following campaign, notably a brace against neighbours Xerez CD in a 6–0 home rout. He played with the team in every professional level, starting in division four.

Ortiz, who was the undisputed captain when in the starting XI, finished as Almería's third-best scorer in 2006–07 as they reached La Liga for the first time in their history. He netted ten goals (behind only Albert Crusat and Míchel), appearing in 24 games the following campaign mainly as a substitute.

On 3 January 2010, after just five minutes on the pitch, Ortiz scored his only goal of the season, a last-minute winner which was the only in the home fixture against neighbours Xerez as both sides struggled immensely in the league; Almería had just recently fired manager Hugo Sánchez, but the player's role remained obscure under new boss Juan Manuel Lillo (he totalled 17 appearances, all from the bench, in only 226 minutes).

Ortiz repeated individual numbers in 2010–11 – 16 league matches, none as a starter – and the club returned to the second tier after four years. The 35-year-old was released in June 2012, after his contract was not renewed.

Personal life
From 2007 to 2009, Ortiz was one of three Almería players with that surname, Mané and Juan Manuel Ortiz being the others.

References

External links

1977 births
Living people
Footballers from Almería
Spanish footballers
Association football midfielders
La Liga players
Segunda División players
Segunda División B players
Tercera División players
CD Roquetas footballers
UD Almería players
Serie B players
Ravenna F.C. players
Spanish expatriate footballers
Expatriate footballers in Italy
Spanish expatriate sportspeople in Italy